The Final Sacrifice (also known as Quest for the Lost City) is a 1990 independent Canadian adventure film produced and directed by Tjardus Greidanus, a freshman at Southern Alberta Institute of Technology, and stars Christian Malcolm and Bruce J. Mitchell. It faded into obscurity not long after its release but saw a renewed interest following its exposure on Mystery Science Theater 3000.

Plot
Teenage Troy McGreggor finds a map belonging to his late father Thomas, who was murdered seven years earlier. Thomas, an archaeologist, met his untimely death after becoming involved with a mysterious cult led by a sinister man with supernatural powers known only as Satoris. The orphaned Troy decides to study the map to learn about the circumstances of his father's death. Sensing the map has been uncovered, the cultists track Troy down. After a failed home invasion, they give chase as Troy flees via bicycle. Eventually, Troy escapes by jumping into the back of a battered pickup truck heading into the Alberta countryside. Soon, the truck breaks down and Troy meets its owner: an alcoholic drifter named Zap Rowsdower. The two are able to get the truck to run again and Zap warms up to Troy as they head to a nearby town. Upon arriving at a gas station to refuel, Zap phones the police to report finding Troy. As he does this, the cultists slowly approach them and begin to pursue them by vehicle into the countryside, where Zap and Troy are able to lose them.

Later that night, Zap reveals to Troy the origins of the Ziox civilization as well as details about his life before becoming a vagabond. The next morning, the truck stalls and the two are left with no other option than to walk the rest of the way back to civilization, unaware that the cultists are still in pursuit. The two wander through the countryside and through a hidden cave. They find themselves pursued by the cult again as this leads them to the lodge of a shotgun-wielding hermit, Mike Pipper (Ron Anderson). A tear in Rowsdower's jacket reveals that he was a member of the same cult that has been after them. Before opening fire on them, Rowsdower calls Troy by his surname to save them. Pipper, recognizing the name, reveals that he was a close friend as well as an expedition partner of Thomas' and has been hiding in the woods from Satoris for the past seven years. He later explains how the cultists are the last descendants of an ancient and advanced race called the Ziox, who had inhabited the area long before the Indians, and whose civilization was destroyed by their god in a month-long rainstorm after they turned to worshiping unholy idols. According to Pipper, the Ziox built a great city that was more advanced than "anything the ancient Egyptians or Romans ever knew". He believes that Satoris wants to raise the buried city in hopes that it will restore power to the Ziox and allow him to conquer/rule the entire world. After Zap leaves the two, Pipper confides to Troy that Rowsdower was with the cult the night Troy’s father was killed and that Zap may have possibly been the one that killed him. In a dream sequence, Rowsdower relives the night the cult’s insignia was branded on his arm, like the other cultists. Satoris seems to be able to torment Rowsdower through the mark, as we see Rowsdower writhing in agony while asleep, presumably having a Satoris-induced nightmare.

Troy is captured by Satoris, who uses the map to locate their ancient idol. Satoris means to make Troy the titular final sacrifice. Pipper gives him his horse and a rifle, directing him to the ancient Ziox sacrifice site that he was able to decipher from Troy's map. Rowsdower discovers the site of the idol and duels with Satoris. During the fight, Satoris mocks Rowsdower with the fact that he could not bring himself to kill Troy’s father, implying Satoris had to do it himself. Satoris is about to kill Rowsdower when Troy manages to intervene, shooting the cult leader. Satoris’ death causes the destruction of the idol and the reemergence of the lost city of Ziox, indicating that Satoris was the true final sacrifice. Instead of bringing about evil, the risen city (as Pipper had foretold) is actually a force for good, and Satoris' cult breaks up as its members are freed from his evil influence. Troy and Rowsdower observe the rise of the lost city from the ground, then drive off together.

Cast
 Christian Malcolm as Troy McGreggor
 Bruce J. Mitchell as Zap Rowsdower
 Shane Marceau as Satoris
 Ron Anderson as Mike Pipper
 Bharbara Egan as Aunt Betty
 Randy Vasseur as Thomas McGreggor

Production
The Final Sacrifice arose as the project of a film student named Tjardus Greidanus, who was enrolled in the filmmaker program at the Southern Alberta Institute of Technology. The film was completed with a budget of approximately CAD$1,500 using school cameras. Christian Malcolm, who starred as Troy, was a fellow student of Greidanus and co-wrote the screenplay. Filming took place in Water Valley, Alberta, and Cremona, Alberta.

Since making the film, Greidanus has gained success as a director of making-of documentaries, including several for the films of Michael Mann. Malcolm has continued working on stage and screen, and Mitchell continued as a stage actor and musician until his April 2018 death.

Home media
The Final Sacrifice was released under the title of Quest for the Lost City on VHS and LaserDisc, although it is currently out of print.

Mystery Science Theater 3000
In 1998, the film was featured on Mystery Science Theater 3000, as experiment #910. The Final Sacrifice was one of seven 1990s made films that went on to appear on the series during its original run.

The episode featuring the film was released on the Mystery Science Theater 3000 - XVII DVD collection by Shout! Factory on March 16, 2010. It includes an interview with Mitchell discussing the film and the MST3K treatment.

The episode finished fourth in a poll of MST3K Season 11 Kickstarter backers, which qualified it to be one of six episodes chosen to appear on the MST3K 2016 Turkey Day Marathon. Writer Jim Vorel chose the episode as the series' best in his rankings of the first 11 seasons (191 episodes) of MST3K.

References

External links
 
 MST3K Episode Guide: The Final Sacrifice
 Photo of VHS cover

1990 films
1990s adventure films
Canadian adventure films
Canadian independent films
Films shot in Alberta
Films about cults
1990s rediscovered films
Rediscovered Canadian films
English-language Canadian films
Canadian direct-to-video films
1990s English-language films
1990s Canadian films